Bernard Cahier (20 June 1927 – 10 July 2008) was a French Formula One photo-journalist.

Cahier began photographing F1 in 1952 and in 1968 he was one of the founders of the International Racing Press Association (IRPA) which began the process of organising the media in F1. After the conflict with the FIA and FOCA, he remained close to F1 by running the Cahier Archive, one of the sport's most complete archives.

In 1966 Cahier helped John Frankenheimer to make the Grand Prix movie and even played a role himself.

Filmography

Bibliography
 Pilotes légendaires de la Formule 1, with Xavier Chimits and Paul-Henri Cahier, Editions Tana, 2 October 2006
 Mes meilleurs souvenirs, With Xavier Chimits, Editions Drivers, 11 January 2007
 F-Stops, pit stops, laughter & tears, Autosports Marketing Associates Ltd, 2007
 Grand Prix Racers (Portraits of Speed)  Motorbooks International, May 2008

References

External links
 
 The Cahier Archive
 Bernard Cahier 1927-2008 at Grandprix.com, July 10, 2008
 

1927 births
2008 deaths
French photographers
French motorsport people
Formula One photographers